Ashin Khammai Dhammasāmi (born 1964), also known as Oxford Sayadaw, is a prominent Burmese Theravada Buddhist monk. He founded Oxford Buddha Vihara in 2003, where he serves as the abbot. He also serves as the Buddhist chaplain to Oxford University, a member of the Oxford Council of Faith, a fellow of Oxford Centre for Buddhist Studies, and a world council member for Religions for Peace. In 2014, he founded Shan State Buddhist University in Taunggyi.

Dhammasāmi was born in 1964 in Naungpan village, Lecha Township, Shan State, Burma (now Myanmar). He was ordained as a samanera at the age of six, and was ordained as a Buddhist monk at the age of 19.  In 2004, he obtained a PhD at Oxford University.

References 

1964 births
Theravada Buddhist monks
Burmese Theravada Buddhists
Burmese Buddhist monks
Living people
People from Shan State
Alumni of the University of Oxford
Alumni of the University of Kelaniya